Daniel  Ndambuki famously known as Churchill(born 30 October 1977) is a Kenyan comedian who hosts the comedy television show  Churchill Show on TV47 Kenya Kenya on Sundays.  Churchill was born in Kitui town, but moved to Machakos. He has worked in the comedy industry since 1996 and has now become a household name in Kenya. He launched the Churchill Live Comedy Show in September 2008 but was renamed Churchill Show during its third season in 2012. The show has given a platform to hundreds of comedians in the country, the most successful ones being Eric Omondi, Teacher Wanjiku, Professor Hammo, MCA Tricky, Jemutai, Magazine (DJ Shitii) and Dr. Kingori.

Early life
Daniel Ndambuki aka Churchill is one of the few Kenyans to be on Who Is Who List. The Machakos County born comedian studied at Mumbuni High School. Among the films he has featured in include: The First Grader (2010) and (2007).

Churchill, together with KJ, Kajairo, Mudomo Baggy and Nyambane, created “Red Kona”, a comedy show on Tv, which increased their fan-base. Churchill went to co-present with Maina Kageni on Classic 105 FM (Which he still does today) doubling up as “the Tea Lady-... Philigona” and as Mwalimu King’angi .

He is rated number 7  among Kenya’s 100 most influential people with the current president topping the list.

He has nurtured and  brand stand-up comedy. Churchill has cracked many Kenyan ribs with his "clean", family friendly shows. 
CNN recently classified him as one Africa's funniest comedians.

Number One Show
Churchill has brought a new and fresh style of comedy to the Kenyan airwaves and mainstream media since the early 2000, that has garnered him hundreds of thousands to millions fans on radio, television and the Internet. Churchill is now a Kenyan household name.

His wide recognition as a comedian started heightening in all-time hit comedy show “Redykyulass” in which he acted alongside Walter Mongare(Nyambane), Peter Kaimenyi (Kajairo), Maurice Otieno (Mdomo Baggy), John Kiarie (KJ) and Anthony Njuguna. He currently boasts a successive Live TV, the Churchill Live.

His hit show Churchill Live has increasingly become East Africa’s most popular and hilarious TV Show in addition to gaining momentous international interest from comedy enthusiasts in the US, the UK, India, Germany, and rest of the world.

Top Facebook
Churchill became the first Kenyan to hit 1,000,000 likes on Facebook, by now he has garnered over 2,000,000 fan base in social network Facebook. the highest of any individual celebrity in Kenya. He is also the CEO of his company, Laugh Industry Kenya.

Kids Festival
He has managed to win the hearts of Kenyan children and families by hosting a weekly segment on Churchill show dubbed “Toto’s corner” and also the hosting of Kids Festival which always sees a turnout of 55,000 plus kids and families.

Churchill Show
Churchill Show Comedy TV program has featured influential personalities, politicians, big entertainment personalities and other remarkable people across the socio-economic continuum
“Interviews with Kenyan big names combined with a touch of Churchill's brand of comedy doused in comic brilliance on production makes it a programme on par with none.  All the while not forgetting the lighter note in "Toto's corner"

Churchill Academy
Churchill as a mentor and pioneer in the industry of the genre, has managed to grow the comedy Industry in East Africa by scouting and nurturing talent.
Initially with a talent search program dubbed ‘Top Comic’ that have put forward leading comedy brands, now there is the two weekly shows that air on TV i.e. #ChurchillShow & #ChurchillRaw…this offer a platform that acts as a spring board for the new talents and brands.

Working with a creative team of 20 mentors. The academy has managed to create 73 new comedians and counting, that have so far entered the market and are becoming household names with a thousands others still in training and more signing up everyday!

Awards and honors
The Churchill Comedy Brand has grown by leaps and bounds and garnered loads of awards and honours including but not limited to:

2015 Olx SOMA (Social Media Awards)- Overall Personality of The Year
2015 Bingwa Music Awards (BMA) – Showbiz Personality Of The Year
2014 PRISK Award – for being a founding director
2014 Sanaa Theatre Awards – Best Production Of TV Comedy Recorded Before A Live Audience
2014 Cheka Awards – Best TV Stand-up Comedy Show
2014 Cheka Awards – Male TV Stand-up Comedian
2014 Kalasha Awards – Best TV Comedy
2014 Olx SOMA (Social Media Awards)- overall personality of the year
2014 Olx SOMA (Social Media Awards) –Most influential Media Personality
2014 Transform Kenya Awards -Winner in the Arts & Culture Category
2013 Cheka Awards -Winner Best TV Stand Up Comedy
2013 Cheka Awards -Comedy Mentor Award
2013 Olx SOMA (Social Media Awards) - Winner Facebook Fan page Of the Year
2013 Olx SOMA (Social Media Awards) - Overall Social Media Personality Of The Year
2013 Olx SOMA (Social Media Awards) - Television Show Of The Year
2013 Sanaa Theatre Awards - Best Comedy Kenyan Pig Cat And Dogs - Heartstrings Kenya
2012 Marketing Society Of Kenya Awards - Winner Best Personal Branding Effort
2012 Kalasha Awards - Best TV Entertainment Churchill Live – Cinematic Solutions/ Laugh Industry
2012 UK Kenya Achievers Award For Excellence In Comedy
2011  State Commendation Award -Order Of The Grand Warrior (OGW)
2011  Marketing Society Of Kenya Awards -Best Personal Branding  Award
2010 CHAT (Chaguo La Teeniez Awards) Winner Teeniez’ TV Comedy Or Reality Show
2010 CHAT (Chaguo La Teeniez Awards) Winner Teeniez’ Role Model
2009 Kalasha Awards Winner -Best Comedy Program
2009 Kalasha Awards Winner - Best TV Program Overall
2007 Word Of Life Winner Theatre Person Of Year
1999 Mavuno Awards Winner Best Narrator

videos,interviews and more info

References

External links

 
 

Kenyan male television actors
Kenyan male comedians
Living people
1977 births